Anna Cruz Lebrato (born 27 October 1986) is a Spanish professional basketball player, currently playing for Spanish team Barça CBS (F.C.Barcelona). She developed her professional career in several clubs in Spain, Russia, Turkey and the United States, and had 178 caps for the Spain's national basketball team from 2009 to 2019, winning a total of eight medals. She also won the 2015 WNBA, the 2017 EuroLeague and the 2017 and 2019 EuroBaskets.

Club career
Cruz started playing basketball in clubs in her hometown Barcelona, making the debut in the Spanish top tier league with UB-Barça at 16, still a junior. Despite winning two leagues in 2003 and 2005, the lack of playtime prompted her to move to CB Ciudad de Burgos, but in her third season there the team was relegated and she went back to Barcelona to play at CB Olesa – Espanyol. She played the following four seasons at Rivas Ecópolis in Madrid, winning two Spanish Cups in 2011 and 2013 and playing the four seasons in the EuroLeague.

She moved abroad in 2013 to play for Russian team Nadezhda Orenburg, where she remained for three seasons. Since the summer of 2014 she has combined the European season with the WNBA, first at New York Liberty and with the Minnesota Lynx since 2015, winning the WNBA championship once. She chose to rest for the summer of 2017 and not to play the WNBA season with the Lynx.

At Dynamo Kursk between 2016 and 2019, she won her first Euroleague. title in 2017 under coach Lucas Mondelo. After a short spell at Turkish club Fenerbahçe in 2019, she returned to Spain for the 2020-21 season.

Career statistics

WNBA

Regular season

|-
| align="left" | 2014
| align="left" | New York
| 34 || 34 || 27.1 || .462 || .347 || .692 || 3.5 || 3.6 || 1.3 || 0.3 || 2.1 || 7.7
|-
|style="text-align:left;background:#afe6ba;"|  2015†
| align="left" | Minnesota
| 22 || 17 || 29.1 || .474 || .250 || .786 || 3.6 || 3.0 || 1.0 || 0.2 || 2.2 || 8.0
|-
| align="left" | 2016
| align="left" | Minnesota
| 6 || 0 || 10.0 || .455 || 1.000 || 1.000 || 1.0 || 2.0 || 0.3 || 0.0 || 0.3 || 2.8
|-
| align="left" | Career
| align="left" | 3 years, 2 teams
| 62 || 51 || 26.2 || .466 || .314 || .753 || 3.3 || 3.2 || 1.1 || 0.2 || 2.0 || 7.4

Playoffs

|-
|style="text-align:left;background:#afe6ba;"|  2015†
| align="left" | Minnesota
| 10 || 0 || 22.1 || .385 || .308 || .667 || 2.1 || 2.7 || 0.9 || 0.1 || 1.6 || 5.2 
|-
| align="left" | 2016
| align="left" | Minnesota
| 6 || 0 || 8.5 || .200 || .500 || .000 || 1.0 || 1.2 || 0.3 || 0.0 || 0.7 || 1.2
|-
| align="left" | Career
| align="left" | 2 years, 1 team
| 16 || 0 || 17.0 || .343 || .333 || .667 || 1.7 || 2.1 || 0.7 || 0.1 || 1.3 || 3.7

EuroLeague

National team
Cruz started playing with Spain's youth teams at 17, winning a total of three medals from 2004 to 2007. She made her debut with the senior team in 2009 at 22 and played her last game in 2019, winning 158 caps 7 PPG,  participating in the Rio 2016 Olympics, three World Championships and five European Championships:

  2004 FIBA Europe Under-18 Championship (youth)
 5th 2005 FIBA Under-19 World Championship (youth)
 4th 2006 FIBA Europe Under-20 Championship (youth)
 9th 2007 FIBA Under-21 World Championship (youth)
  2009 Eurobasket
  2010 World Championship
 9th 2011 Eurobasket
  2014 World Championship
  2015 Eurobasket
  2016 Summer Olympics
  2017 Eurobasket 
  2018 World Championship
  2019 Eurobasket

Her buzzer-beater shot against Turkey in the 2016 Rio Olympics quarter-finals is one of her key shots with the national team.

References

External links

 
 
 
 
 
 
 

1986 births
Living people
Basketball players at the 2016 Summer Olympics
Medalists at the 2016 Summer Olympics
Minnesota Lynx players
New York Liberty players
Olympic basketball players of Spain
Olympic medalists in basketball
Olympic silver medalists for Spain
Shooting guards
Small forwards
Spanish expatriate basketball people in Russia
Spanish expatriate basketball people in the United States
Spanish women's basketball players
Basketball players from Barcelona
Undrafted Women's National Basketball Association players